Trond Kjøll (born 13 March 1953 in Modum, Norway), is a Norwegian rifle shooter and coach.  Kjøll has held the world record for the 300 m Standard Rifle since 1995. He became national champion and won the Kings Cup at the National Matches at Lesja in 1995. Before the 2004 Olympics in Athens he was coach for the Norwegian national team, and he has been shooting coach for the Norwegian national biathlon team several times, most recently from 2004 to 2006.

References

Norwegian male sport shooters
1953 births
Living people
Norwegian sports coaches
People from Modum
Sportspeople from Viken (county)